Isyesye is an administrative ward in the Mbeya Urban district of the Mbeya Region of Tanzania. In 2016 the Tanzania National Bureau of Statistics report there were 8,784 people in the ward, from 7,970 in 2012.

Neighborhoods 
The ward has 3 neighborhoods Mwantengule, RRM, and Vingunguti.

References 

Wards of Mbeya Region